The Murray Football Netball League is an Australian rules football and netball league affiliated with the Victorian Country Football League. The league covers a large area of northern Victoria and southern New South Wales from Shepparton in the south to Deniliquin in the north.

It covers much the same area as the Picola & District Football League but the teams tend to be the larger communities and towns.

History 
The "Murray Football League" (MFL) was established in 1931, when it superseded the old Goulburn Valley Football Association, with the following clubs, Barooga, Cobram, Numurkah, Strathmerton and Tocumwal.

Nathalia Football Club's admission into the MFL was initially rejected in 1931 by club delegates and they entered the Western and Moira Ridings Football Association. Berrigan, Finley and Nathalia's application for admission into the MFL in 1932 was rejected and they continued to play in their existing competitions. These three clubs were finally admitted into the MFL in 1933.

At a MFL club's delegates meeting in June, 1940, club's decided to abandoned the season and a motion was carried to conclude the season at the completion of the first round of MFL matches (Rd.7), after all teams had played each other once. Nathalia Football Club were undefeated when the season was officially abandoned in 1940.

Between 1941 and 1945 the league went into recess for World War II.

During its first 44 years, the league's administration was very stable, with only four presidents and three secretaries, with Mr. M D "Des" O'Dwyer presiding from 1931 to the late 1950s and Mr. Bill Limbrick of Katunga was secretary from 1949 to 1974 and Mr. D McClelland President from 1966 to 1974. The MFL played in the NSW Australian Football Championships in the mid-1970s. Long time secretary, Les Belt held office from 1930 to 1948.

The senior football goal kicking award was initially known as the Les Belt Trophy (MFL Secretary & donor) in the 1940s, before changing to the Les Mogg Perpetual Trophy in 1962, with Trevor Sutton – Deniliquin holding the record with 227 goals that he kicked in 1982, plus 22 goals in the finals for a total of 249 goals.

Former Jerilderie player, Bill Brownless kicked 148 goals and was runner up in the 1985 O’Dwyer Medal, before making his debut with Geelong Football Club in 1986.

In 1995 Cobram football and netball club won seniors, reserves, fourths, and all netball side grand finals.  9 out of 10 grand finals for the season.

Following the disbanding of the Echuca Football League, Echuca United and Moama joined the league in 1997.

In 2006 Tongala and Rumbalara made their debut with the league.  Tongala was previously in the Goulburn Valley Football League and Rumbalara was in the now-defunct Central Goulburn Football League.

The 2008 premiership was won by Nathalia to complete 4 in a row premiership wins. Nathalia repeated this effort in 2018 and went one further in 2019, achieving 5 premierships a row.

Nathalia is the only team to complete 5 premierships in a row. Nathalia alongside Deniliquin are the only teams to complete 4 in a row with Nathalia achieving this feat twice.

In 2018 Tungamah, Shepparton East and Katandra joined the Murray Football League after leaving the new merging Picola & District Football League due to their affiliation dispute with AFL Goulburn Murray. Shepparton East moved onto the Kyabram & District Football League at the beginning of the 2019 season.

Clubs

Current

Former Clubs 
Berrigan Football Club – 1933 to 2002
Coleambally Football Club – 1980 to 1983
Jerilderie Football Club – 1932 to 1956, 1964 to 1993
Katamatite Football Club – 1940, 1946 & 1947
Muckatah Football Club – 1932 to 1939
Shepparton East Football Club – 2018
Strathmerton Football Club – 1931 to 1935 & 1938 to 1993
Tocumwal Football Club – 1931 to 2013

Senior Football Premierships

Reserves Football Premierships 
Gibbins Cup

1959: Numurkah
1960: Cobram
1961: Numurkah
1962: Deniliquin
1963: Numurkah
1964: Numurkah
1965: Numurkah
1966: Berrigan
1967: Deniliquin
1968: Cobram
1969: Tocumwal
1970: Tocumwal
1971: Tocumwal
1972: Deniliquin
1973: Deniliquin
1974: Strathmerton
1975: Deniliquin
1976: Cobram
1977: Cobram
1978: Deniliquin
1979: Deniliquin
1980: Finley

1981: Finley
1982: Finley
1983: Finley
1984: Cobram
1985: Deniliquin
1986: Finley
1987: Mulwala
1988: Cobram
1989: Barooga
1990: Finley
1991: Finley
1992: Cobram
1993: Deniliquin
1994: Cobram
1995: Cobram
1996: Deniliquin
1997: Cobram
1998: Moama
1999: Numurkah
2000: Nathalia
2001: Deniliquin
2002: Mulwala

2003: Moama
2004: Mulwala
2005: Mulwala
2006: Barooga
2007: Mulwala
2008: Barooga
2009: Barooga
2010: Mulwala
2011: Moama
2012: Mulwala
2013:
2014:
2015:
2016:
2017:
2018:
2019:
2022: Tongala

Murray FNL – Best & Fairest Awards 
Senior Football – O'Dwyer Medal
This award is named after long serving MFL President, Mr. M.D. "Des" O'Dwyer (1931 to 1954), who initially donated a gold medal in 1934.

1934: George Burke – Numurkah (7 votes) & Norman Taylor – Finley (7)
1935: George Bourke – Numurkah (7)
1936: George Bush – Berrigan (3 & 1/2) 
1937: George Bush – Berrigan (3)
1938: George Bourke – Numurkah (10) 
1939: George Bourke – Numurkah (12)
1940: No award. 1940 abandoned after Rd.7
1941: MFL in recess due to WW2
1942: MFL in recess due to WW2
1943: MFL in recess due to WW2
1944: MFL in recess due to WW2
1945: MFL in recess due to WW2
1946: Merv Dudley – Numurkah (?) & Des Martin – Berrigan (?)
1947: Bill Lumsden – Katamatite (20)
1948: Ron Simpson – Cobram (16)
1949: Syd Stewart – Numurkah
1950: Syd Stewart – Numurkah (21) 
1951: J. Stein – Tocumwal (15)
1952: Viv T. Davies – Numurkah (22)
1953: Frank Scanlon – Tocumwal (30)
1954: Alan Ednie – Berrigan (16) 
1955: R. Thompson – Finley (19)
1956: Len Carter – Strathmerton (21)
1957: J. J. Ryan – Strathmerton (21)
1958: J. J. Ryan – Strathmerton (21)
1959: J. J. Ryan – Strathmerton (25) won on count back
1960: L. Sexton – Berrigan (23 votes)
1961: Les Mogg – Cobram (17)
1962: Graham Ellis – Berrigan (25)
1963: J. J. Ryan – Strathmerton (20)
1964: J. J. Ryan – Strathmerton (20)

1965: Jim Cullen – Tocumwal (25)
1966: N. Smith, Strathmerton (28)
1967: Graham Ion, Deniliquin (29)
1968: Fred Way, Berrigan (20)
1969: Laurie Flanigan Cobram (21)
1970: P. Dealy, Numurkah (23)
1971: Trevor Miller, Jerilderie (32)
1972: Bruce Day, Tocumwal (20)
1973: R. Dunn, Strathmerton (25)
1974: Terry Wells, Jerilderie (20)
1975: Steven Way, Berrigan (12)
1976: P. Pettigrew, Nathalia (15)
1977: Michael Hawkins, Finley (16)
1978: S. Maddox, Cobram (25)
1979: B. Young, Deniliquin (23)
1980: Terry Wells, Cobram (21)
1981: G. Ralph, Numurkah (18)
1982: Trevor Sutton, Deniliquin (26)
1983: Wayne Deledio, Nathalia (28)
1984: C. Bell, Strathmerton (20)
1985: B. Morrison, Nathalia (26)
1986: J. Greiner, Berrigan (20)
1987: Philip Beams, Mulwala (25)
1988: I. Newell, Strathmerton (29)
1989: E. Muench, Jerilderie (27)
1990: P. Stevenson, Barooga (30)
1991: Brian Bourke, Deniliquin (22)
1992: Kelly O’Donnell, Barooga (28)
1993: John Brunner, Barooga (27)
1994: Chris Foran, Barooga (27)
1995: John Fisicaro, Deniliquin (21)
1996: John Fisicaro, Deniliquin (20)
1997: John Brunner, Barooga (37)
1998: Michael Smith, Cobram (26) & Shaun Gordon, Congupna (26)
1999: Robert Lamberti, Mulwala (26)

2000: Brendan Hogan, Moama (24 votes)
2001: Robert Lamberti, Mulwala (30)
2002: John Fisicaro, Deniliquin (25)
2003: G. Spinks, Deniliquin (23)
2004: Ashley Gemmill, Nathalia (25)
2005: Nathan Gemmill, Nathalia (19) & Jason Sanderson, Mulwala (19)
2006: Marty Brooks, Barooga (25)
2007: Matthew Byers, Barooga (30)
2008: Daryl Harrison – Tongala (22) & Lee Warnett – Tocumwal (22)
2009: Lee Warnett – Tocumwal (21)
2010: Ryan Bongetti – Cobram (20)
2011: Ryan Bongetti – Cobram (27)
2012: Rowan Priest – Echuca United (29)
2013: Ashley Morris – Deniliquin (28)
2014: Marcus Smith – Barooga (26)
2015: Rhys Archard – Moama (29)
2016: Ned Morrison – Finley (25)
2017: Rhys Archard – Moama (25)
2018: Brodie A’vard – Barooga (37)
2019: Jackson Gash – Mulwala (30)

2014 Ladder

2015 Ladder

2016 Ladder

2017 Ladder

2018 Ladder

References

External links 
 
 
 Full Points Footy- Murray Football League

 
Australian rules football competitions in New South Wales
Australian rules football competitions in Victoria (Australia)
1931 establishments in Australia
Netball leagues in New South Wales
Netball leagues in Victoria (Australia)